Wang Riwei (born 21 March 1993 in Guangzhou) is a Chinese male sprint canoeist. He won the silver medal of the C1 1000 metre canoeing event at the 2015 Asian Canoe Sprint Championships in Palembang, Indonesia, qualified for the Rio 2016 Olympics.

On August 4, 2016, Chinese canoeing team arrived in Rio de Janeiro from São Paulo; during the night, Wang Riwei felt blurring in his left eye. The examination result at hospital was that his left eye appeared to have a retinal detachment, and finally he had to give up playing in the Games.

References

External links 
 
 

1993 births
Living people
Sportspeople from Guangzhou
Chinese male canoeists
Asian Games silver medalists for China
Asian Games medalists in canoeing
Canoeists at the 2014 Asian Games
Medalists at the 2014 Asian Games
20th-century Chinese people
21st-century Chinese people